Pavel Zedníček (born 1 November 1949 in Hoštice-Heroltice) is a Czech actor. He appeared in more than sixty films between 1976 and 2011.

Filmography

External links
 Official website
 

1949 births
Living people
Czech male film actors
Czech male television actors
Czech male voice actors
People from Vyškov District
Janáček Academy of Music and Performing Arts alumni
20th-century Czech male actors
21st-century Czech male actors